Seán Ó Ceallaigh (17 April 1896 – 15 June 1994) was an Irish Fianna Fáil politician. He was first elected as a Fianna Fáil Teachta Dála (TD) for the Clare constituency at a by-election on 22 July 1959, succeeding Éamon de Valera who had been elected President of Ireland. He was re-elected at the 1961 general election and at the 1965 general election. He did not contest the 1969 general election. 

Ó Ceallaigh taught in the all-Irish Coláiste Uí Chomhraidhe, Carrigaholt, County Clare. His son, Fiachra Ó Ceallaigh, was an Auxiliary Bishop of Dublin.

References

 

1896 births
1994 deaths
Fianna Fáil TDs
Members of the 16th Dáil
Members of the 17th Dáil
Members of the 18th Dáil
Irish schoolteachers